Tommy Kendall (born October 17, 1966) is an American race car driver and television broadcaster. He is best known for his IMSA GT Championship and SCCA Trans-Am Series career.

Racing career
Son of race driver Charles Kendall, Kendall began his racing career competing at the IMSA GT Championship. He drove a Mazda RX-7 in the GTU category while studying and by the time he completed his studies, he took the 1986 and 1987 championships. Later he won three other titles in the same car, which he still owns.

He later dominated the SCCA Trans-Am Series in the 1990s, scoring four series championships. His greatest year came in 1997, when he won 11 races in a row out of the 13 on the schecule—almost a perfect season. During this time, Kendall was also honored by representing the series for six IROC seasons.

He ran in fourteen NASCAR Cup Series races between 1987 and 1998. He raced primarily only on road courses as a road course ringer, and scored one Top-10 finish. He nearly won the 1991 Banquet Frozen Foods 300K at Sears Point Raceway, in which he led 12 laps before cutting a tire with two laps to go following a late-race collision with Mark Martin. The two drivers, who were briefly Roush-Fenway Racing teammates in Trans-Am, would not speak about the incident for years until they rehashed their late-race collision on Martin's podcast, twenty years later.

While competing in Winston Cup as a ringer, Kendall had a single start in the NASCAR Busch Series. Kendall also had one start with Dick Johnson Racing at the 1996 AMP Bathurst 1000 in Australia co-driving with Steven Johnson, the son of team boss Dick Johnson. Johnson and Kendall finished 8th in their Ford EF Falcon. Of the American drivers who have competed in the Bathurst 1000 since the race moved to Bathurst in 1963 including three time Indianapolis 500 winner Johnny Rutherford, Janet Guthrie (the first woman to ever qualify for the Indy 500 in 1977), Dick Barbour, Sam Posey, Bob Tullius, John Andretti and Scott Pruett, Kendall holds the distinction of being the first one to have ever finished the race (Pruett in his only start would finish 11th the next year at Bathurst).

On June 30, 1991, Kendall suffered serious leg injuries at Watkins Glen when a mechanical failure caused his Intrepid RM-1 IMSA GTP car to leave the track and crash head-on into a tire wall. This occurred along the same area of track where J. D. McDuffie of NASCAR Winston Cup fame was killed only a month later, and both crashes led to the addition of a bus stop chicane on the backstretch. Kendall spoke of this incident during Episode 4, Season 2 of the Speed Channel series, Setup as a "crossroads in his racing career." He returned to racing close to a year later in June 1992. He also discussed his accident on Athlete 360, a sports medicine television show hosted by Mark Adickes.

Broadcasting career
In the 2000s Kendall became a television analyst for the Champ Car series. He is also the host of the Speed Test Drive promotional television series where he and another professional race car driver drive a new vehicle on a race course while being able to remotely talk to each other and offer their positive thoughts on the car.

In 2007 and 2008, Kendall was one of the hosts of the show Setup on SpeedTV.

On July 15, 2012, Kendall revealed on SpeedTV's WindTunnel program that he would be returning to the cockpit as one of four full-time drivers in a factory-backed Dodge Viper effort competing in the American Le Mans Series.

On September 22, 2013, Kendall's new show, Driven - A Race Without Boundaries, premiered on Fox Sports 1. It also stars Rhys Millen and is hosted by Tiff Needell.

Personal life
Kendall was raised in the city of La Cañada Flintridge, California and is a 1984 graduate of La Cañada High School.

Kendall earned a degree in economics from UCLA and to this day maintains an avid interest in business.

Hall of Fame
In 2015, he was inducted in the Motorsports Hall of Fame of America.

Motorsports career results

NASCAR
(key) (Bold - Pole position awarded by qualifying time. Italics - Pole position earned by points standings or practice time. * – Most laps led.)

Winston Cup Series

Busch Series

24 Hours of Le Mans results

Bathurst 1000 result

References

External links
 
 Tommy Kendall at Driver Database
 Tommy Kendall at IMDb

Living people
1966 births
Sportspeople from Santa Monica, California
Racing drivers from California
24 Hours of Le Mans drivers
American Le Mans Series drivers
Trans-Am Series drivers
NASCAR drivers
International Race of Champions drivers
University of California, Los Angeles alumni
FIA World Endurance Championship drivers
Dick Johnson Racing drivers
Hendrick Motorsports drivers
RFK Racing drivers